Jerry Wunderlich (Gerald White Wunderlich) (August 25, 1889 – 13 April 1937) was an American racecar driver.

Indy 500 result

References

1889 births
1937 deaths
Racing drivers from Illinois
Indianapolis 500 drivers
AAA Championship Car drivers